Arthur Smith (November 15, 1785 – March 30, 1853) was a U.S. Representative from Virginia.

Biography
Born at "Windsor Castle," near Smithfield, Isle of Wight County, Virginia, Smith attended an academy at Smithfield, Virginia, and graduated from the College of William and Mary, Williamsburg, Virginia.  He studied law, was admitted to the bar in 1808, and commenced practice in Smithfield, Virginia.  He also engaged in agricultural pursuits.

Smith served as colonel in the War of 1812.  He also served as member of the Virginia House of Delegates from 1818 to 1820.

Smith was elected as a Democratic-Republican to the Seventeenth Congress and reelected as a Crawford Republican to the Eighteenth Congress (March 4, 1821 – March 3, 1825).  He was not a candidate for renomination in 1824.

Smith resumed the practice of law, and again served as member of the Virginia House of Delegates in 1836–1841. He died in Smithfield, Virginia, March 30, 1853.  He was interred in the family burying ground on Windsor Castle estate, near Smithfield, Virginia.

Electoral history

1823; Smith was re-elected unopposed.

Sources

1785 births
1853 deaths
Virginia lawyers
Members of the Virginia House of Delegates
College of William & Mary alumni
People from Smithfield, Virginia
People from Virginia in the War of 1812
Democratic-Republican Party members of the United States House of Representatives from Virginia
19th-century American politicians